John Spreul may refer to:
 John Spreul (apothecary), apothecary in Glasgow, Scotland
 John Spreul (town clerk), town clerk in Glasgow, Scotland